The 2015 Malaysia FAM League (referred to as the FAM League) is the 63rd season of the FAM League since its establishment in 1952. The league is currently the third level football league in Malaysia. Kuantan are the defending champions and currently play in the second level of Malaysian football, Malaysia Premier League.

Rule changes
The FAM League introduced the "home grown players" rule, which aims to encourage the development of young footballers at FAM League clubs. The new rule required clubs to name at least five U-21 players in their squad.

Teams
The following teams will be participate in the 2015 Malaysia FAM League. In order by the number given by FAM:-

  Perlis FA (Relegated from 2014 Malaysia Premier League)
  MOF F.C.
  PBAPP FC (Relegated from 2014 Malaysia Premier League)
  Melaka United
  Shahzan Muda S.C.
  Kedah United F.C.
  Megah Murni F.C. (New Team)
  Harimau Muda C
  Sungai Ara F.C.
  MISC-MIFA
  Hanelang F.C.
  Johor Darul Ta'zim III F.C. (New Team)
  Penjara F.C. (New Team)
  AirAsia F.C (New Team)
  UKM F.C. (New Team)
  Real Mulia F.C. (New Team)
  Felcra F.C. (New Team)
  Young Fighters F.C. (New Team)
  Ipoh FA (New Team)

To Malaysia Premier League

 Kuantan FA
 Kuala Lumpur FA

New Team

 Megah Murni F.C.
 AirAsia F.C.
 Johor Darul Ta'zim III F.C.
 Penjara F.C.
 UKM F.C.
 Real Mulia F.C.
 Felcra F.C.
 Young Fighters F.C.
 Ipoh FA

Withdrawn Teams

 Cebagoo F.C.
 YBU F.C.

Team summaries

Stadia and locations

  1 Correct as of end of 2014 Malaysia FAM League season
  2 Shahzan Muda uses the Darul Makmur Stadium until the grass pitch re-laid work being done in Temerloh Mini Stadium.

Personnel and kits
Note: Flags indicate national team as has been defined under FIFA eligibility rules. Players and Managers may hold more than one non-FIFA nationality.

Group stage

Group A

Result table

Group B

Result table

Final

Season statistics

Scoring

Top scorers

Champions

See also

 2015 Malaysia Super League
 2015 Malaysia Premier League
 2015 Malaysia FA Cup
 2015 Malaysia President's Cup
 2015 Malaysia Youth League

References

External links
 Football Association of Malaysia
 SPMB 
 Liga FAM at Facebook

2015
3